is a cover EP by Japanese singer/songwriter Yōko Oginome. Released through Victor Entertainment on February 22, 2006, the album features bosa nova covers of six English-language hit songs.

The album peaked at No. 282 on Oricon's albums chart.

Track listing

Charts

References

External links
 
 
 

2006 albums
Yōko Oginome albums
Covers albums
English-language Japanese albums
Victor Entertainment EPs